Lori Copeland (born June 12) is an American author of over 95 novels.

Biography
Lori Copeland had a relatively late start in writing, breaking into publishing in 1982 when she was forty years old.   Over the next dozen years, Copeland's romance novels achieved much success, as was evidenced by her winning the Romantic Times Reviewer's Choice Award, The Holt Medallion, and Waldenbooks' Best Seller award.  Despite her success in more mainstream romantic fiction, in 1995, Copeland decided to switch focus.  Her subsequent books have been in the relatively new subgenre of Christian romance.  She has also collaborated with author Angela Elwell Hunt on a series of Christian romance novels.

Copeland has been inducted into the Missouri Writers Hall of Fame.  She and her husband of over forty years, Lance, live in Springfield, Missouri.  They have three grown sons.  Copeland and her husband are active supporters of mission work in Mali, West Africa.

Bibliography

Malone Family
Darling Deceiver (1990)
Built to Last (1992)
A Taste of Temptation (1992)

Harlequin Love and Laughter
Dates and Other Nuts (1996)
Fudgeballs and Other Sweets (1998)

Brides of the West
Faith (1998)
Faith, June, Hope
(omnibus) (1998)
June (1999)
Hope (1999)
Glory (2000)
Glory, Ruth and Patience (omnibus) (2000)
Ruth (2002)
Patience (2004)

Morning Shade Mysteries
A Case of Bad Taste (2003)
A Case of Crooked Letters (2004)
A Case of Nosy Neighbors (2004)

Island of Heavenly Daze
The Island of Heavenly Daze (2001) (with Angela Elwell Hunt)
Grace in Autumn (2001) (with Angela Elwell Hunt)
A Warmth in Winter (2001) (with Angela Elwell Hunt)
A Perfect Love (2002) (with Angela Elwell Hunt)
Hearts at Home (2003) (with Angela Elwell Hunt)

Belles of Timber Creek
Twice Loved (2008)
Three Times Blessed (2009)
One True Love (2010)

Men of the Saddle
The Peacemaker (2005)
The Drifter (2005)
The Maverick (2005)
The Plainsman (2006)

Seattle Brides
A Bride for Noah (Oct 2013)
Rainy Day Dreams (Apr 2014)

Sisters of Mercy Flats
Promise Me Today (1992)
Promise Me Tomorrow (1993)
Promise Me Forever (1994)

Western Sky
The Courtship of Cade Kolby (1997)
Outlaw's Bride (2009)
Walker's Wedding (2010)

The Dakota Diaries Series
Love Blooms in Winter (2011)
Under the Summer Sky (2012)

The Amish of Apple Grove Series
The Heart's Frontier (with Virginia Smith) (2011)
A Plain & Simple Heart (with Virginia Smith) (August 2012)
A Cowboy at Heart (with Virginia Smith) (March 2013)

Novels
Playing for Keeps (1983)
A Tempting Stranger (1983)
Only the Best (1984)
A Winning Combination (1984)
All or Nothing (1984)
Out of Control (1984)
Rainbow's End (1984)
Forever After (1985)
Spitfire (1985)
More Than She Bargained for (1985)
A Love of Our Own (1986)
Hot on His Trail (1986)
Out of This World (1986)
Tug of War (1986)
When Lightning Strikes (1986)
Passion's Folly (1987)
The Trouble With Thorny (1988)
Tale of Love (1988)
Sweet Talkin' Stranger (1989)
Dancy's Woman (1989)
Tall Cotton (1990)
Fool Me Once (1990)
Avenging Angels (1990)
Tiz the Season (1990)
Sweet Hannah Rose (1991)
Passion's Captive (1991)
Melancholy Baby (1991)
Squeeze Play (1991)
Forever, Ashley (1992)
Like Father, Like Son? (1993)
Like Father, Like Daughter? (1993)
Two of a Kind (1993)
High Voltage (1994)
Someone to Love (1995)
All or Nothing: Rainbow's End (1995)
Bridal Lace and Buckskin (1996)
Angel Face and Amazing Grace (1996)
The Bride of Johnny McAllister (1999)
Marrying Walker McKay (2000)
Child of Grace (2001)
Christmas Vows (2001)
Roses Will Bloom Again: ...and Emma's Heart Will Never Be the Same (2002)
Stranded in Paradise: A Story of Letting Go (2002)
Mother of Prevention (2005)
Monday Morning Faith (2006)
Yellow Rose Bride (2006)
Simple Gifts (2007)
When Love Comes My Way (2012)

Omnibus
Playing for Keeps / A Tempting Stranger (1990)
Up for Grabs / Hot on His Trail (1991)
Out of Control / A Winning Combination (1991)
Out of This World / Forever After (1991)
Spitfire / Tug of War (1991)
The Best of Lori Copeland (1991)
Tale of Love / Power and Seduction (1992) (with Amii Lorin)
Timeless Love (1993) (with Catherine Creel, Kay McMahon, Bobbi Smith)
Three Complete Novels: Avenging Angel / Passion's Captive / Sweet Talkin' Stranger (1994)
A Love of Our Own / Passions Folly (1995)
When Lightning Strikes / Tale of Love (1995)
Seasons of Love (1995) (with Elaine Barbieri, Karen Lockwood and Evelyn Rogers)
Love's Legacy (1996) (with Madeline Baker, Mary Balogh, Elaine Barbieri, Cassie Edwards, Heather Graham, Catherine Hart, Virginia Henley, Penelope Neri, Diana Palmer and Janelle Taylor)
Baby on the Doorstep (1997) (with Cassie Edwards and Susan Kay Law)
With This Ring: A Quartet of Charming Stories About Four Very Special Weddings (1998) (with Ginny Aiken, Dianna Crawford and Catherine Palmer)
Fruitcakes and Other Leftovers / Christmas, Texas Style (1999) (with Kimberly Raye)
Women of Faith Fiction Collection (2005) (with Patricia Hickman and Angela Elwell Hunt)

Sources
Tyndale House Publishers. "Lori Copeland Biography".  http://www.tyndale.com/authors/bio.asp?code=145.  Retrieved 26-01-2007.

Living people
20th-century American novelists
21st-century American novelists
American romantic fiction writers
Christian novelists
American historical novelists
Writers of historical romances
Women romantic fiction writers
American women novelists
Women historical novelists
Year of birth missing (living people)
20th-century American women writers
21st-century American women writers